Supasi is a village in Veraval taluka of Gir Somnath District, Gujarat, India.

Villages in Gir Somnath district